The Segway is a two-wheeled, self-balancing personal transporter invented by Dean Kamen and brought to market in 2001 as the Segway HT, subsequently as the Segway PT, and manufactured by Segway Inc. HT is an initialism for "human transporter" and PT for "personal transporter."

Ninebot, a Beijing-based transportation robotics startup rival, acquired Segway Inc. in April 2015, broadened the company to include other transportation devices, and announced in June 2020 it would no longer make a two-wheeled, self-balancing product.

History

Independent company
The Segway PT, referred to during development and initial marketing as the Segway HT, was developed from the self-balancing iBOT wheelchair which was initially developed at University of Plymouth, in conjunction with BAE Systems and Sumitomo Precision Products. Segway's first patent was filed in 1994 and granted in 1997, followed by others, including one submitted in June 1999 and granted in October 2001.

Prior to its introduction, a news report about a proposal for a book about the invention, development, and financing of the Segway led to speculation about the device and its importance. John Doerr speculated that it would be more important than the Internet. South Park devoted an episode to making fun of the hype before the product was released. Steve Jobs was quoted as saying that it was "as big a deal as the PC", (he later expressed a negative opinion, saying that it "sucked", presumably referring to "the design" - but also referred to the (presumably high) price point, asking, "You're sure your market is upscale consumers for transportation?") The device was unveiled on 3 December 2001, following months of public speculation, in Bryant Park, New York City, on the ABC News morning program Good Morning America, with the first units delivered to customers in early 2002.

Steering of early versions was controlled using a twist grip that varied the speeds of the two motors. In September 2003, the Segway PT was recalled, because if users ignored repeated low battery warnings on the PTs, it could ultimately lead them to fall. With a software patch to version 12.0, the PT would automatically slow down and stop in response to detecting low battery power.

Recharging took 8–10 hours.

The company was acquired by British businessman Jimi Heselden from its U.S. inventor Dean Kamen in December 2009. A year later, in an ironic and unfortunate accident, Heselden died after he "plunged into the River Wharfe while riding a rugged country version" of Segway.

Versions of the product prior to 2011 included (in order of release):
 Segway i167 (2001 revealed, 2002 shipped)
 Segway e167: As i167, with addition of electric kickstand
 Segway i180: With lithium-ion batteries
 Segway XT: The first Segway designed specifically for recreation
 Segway i2 (2006): The first on-road Segway PT with LeanSteer
 Segway x2 (2006): The first off-road Segway PT with LeanSteer

In March 2014, Segway announced third generation designs, including the i2 SE and x2 SE sport, new LeanSteer frame and powerbase designs, with integrated lighting.

Subsidiary of Ninebot
Ninebot Inc., a Beijing-based transportation robotics startup and a Segway rival, acquired Segway in April 2015, having raised $80M from Xiaomi and Sequoia Capital. The acquisition came months after the U.S. International Trade Commission agreed to investigate Segway's claim that Ninebot and other companies were infringing on its patents and copyrights. Segway requested the blocking of imports of competing scooters into the United States.

In June 2016, the company launched the Segway miniPRO, a smaller self-balancing scooter.

End of production
In June 2020, Ninebot, the owner of the Segway brand, announced that it would no longer make the namesake two-wheeled, self-balancing product.

Only 140,000 units were sold during the lifetime of the product, and in the later years the Segway PT only made up 1.5% of total company profit. Factors contributing to the end of production include the price (US$5,000 at launch), and the learning curve in learning to balance on a Segway which has led to notable accidents involving Usain Bolt, George W. Bush and the Segway Company owner Jimi Heselden. While the Segway has remained popular for security and tourism, electric scooters have been more popular for personal mobility.

Products
At the end of production in 2020, Segway was selling these five self-balancing scooters:

Professional
 Segway i2 SE (professional self-balancing scooter for use in warehouses and other locations)
 Segway x2 SE (ruggedised self-balancing scooter for use on most challenging terrain)
 Segway Robot (autonomous robot based on the Segway miniPro)

Consumer
 Ninebot by Segway E+ (self-balancing scooter for general use)
 Ninebot by Segway miniPro (smaller self-balancing scooter for general use, controlled by a 'knee control bar')

Technology
The dynamics of the Segway PT are similar to a classic control problem, the inverted pendulum. It uses brushless DC electric motors in each wheel powered by lithium-ion batteries with balance achieved using tilt sensors, and gyroscopic sensors developed by BAE Systems' Advanced Technology Centre. The wheels are driven forward or backward as needed to return its pitch to upright.

Usage

In 2011, the Segway i2 was being marketed to the emergency medical services community. 
In 2018, the police of Stockholm adopted Segways as a permanent transportation method for the patrollers of the old town.

The Segway miniPro is also available to be used as the mobility section of a robot.

Disability Rights Advocates for Technology worked to supply Segway PTs to veterans who had trouble walking. (Segway Inc. cannot market its devices in the US as medical devices. Kamen sold the intellectual property rights for medical purposes to Johnson & Johnson, makers of the iBOT, a self-balancing wheelchair).

The product is capable of covering  on a fully charged lithium-ion battery, depending on terrain, riding style, and the condition of the batteries. The U.S. Consumer Product Safety Commission does not have Segway-specific recommendations but does say that bicycle helmets are adequate for "low-speed, motor-assisted" scooters.

See also
 Scooter (motorcycle)
 Segway polo
 Jonathan Gleich

References

External links

 
 

Personal transporters
Vehicles introduced in 2001
American inventions
2000s fads and trends
Battery electric vehicles
Electric two-wheel vehicles
Mobility devices
Articles containing video clips